The International Radio and Television Organisation (official name in French: Organisation Internationale de Radiodiffusion et de Télévision or OIRT (before 1960 International Broadcasting Organization (IBO), official name in French: Organisation Internationale de Radiodiffusion (OIR)) was an East European network of radio and television broadcasters with the primary purpose of establishing ties and securing an interchange of information between those various organizations responsible for broadcasting services, promoting the interests of broadcasting, seeking by international cooperation a solution to any matter relating to broadcasting, and studying and working out all measures having as their aim the development of broadcasting.

History
Without British participation, 26 members founded the OIR on 28 June 1946. The next day, at the General Assembly of the International Broadcasting Union (IBU), an attempt was made to dissolve this body, but the motion failed to obtain the required majority. However, 18 of the 28 existing members left the IBU and become co-founders of the new OIR.

In 1946, the newly created OIR installed itself in the IBU building in Brussels. Technical activity was taken up again under the authority of two directors, one delegated by the Soviet Union and the other by France. However, the political situation gradually degraded into the Cold War and this created an uneasy situation of distrust within the staff of the Technical Centre.

In 1950 some members (mostly western European) left the organization to form the new European Broadcasting Union (EBU), among them Belgium, Egypt, France, Italy, Lebanon, Luxembourg,  Monaco, Morocco, Netherlands, Tunisia and Yugoslavia.

Broadcasting organizations from the following countries remained members: Albania, Bulgaria, Czechoslovakia,  Finland (also a member of EBU), East Germany, Hungary, Poland, Romania, Syria and the Soviet Union.

As a consequence, the OIR headquarters and its Technical Centre was relocated from Brussels to Prague in 1950. Staff members from Belgium and other Western countries, some of whom had already been active before the war, stayed on in Brussels and the centre became the technical centre of the new EBU.

Unlike the EBU, the OIRT was not limited to European and Mediterranean countries and operated as a global organization. Members of the organization included countries aligned with the Eastern bloc, such as Cuba, Vietnam, the People's Republic of China and North Korea (although the latter's membership was temporarily inactive after their break with the USSR), as well as the allies of the USSR that were temporarily led by communist parties, such as Nicaragua and the Democratic Republic of Afghanistan, and the African and Middle Eastern states having been temporarily associated or supported by the socialist camp.

On January 1, 1993, following the dissolution of the Soviet Union and the end of the Cold War, the OIRT merged with the European Broadcasting Union and all European OIRT memberships were transferred to the EBU. In 2022, Russia got banned from EBU.

Intervision 

The television network of OIRT was established in 1960 and was called Intervision (Russian Интервидение, German Intervision, Bulgarian Интервизия, Polish Interwizja, Czech Intervize, Slovak Intervízia, Hungarian Intervízió, Romanian Interviziune, Finnish Intervisio).

Between 1977 and 1980 the OIRT organised four Intervision Song Contests in Sopot, Poland, in an attempt to imitate the Eurovision Song Contest.

History of members

Associated members

References

External links
Intertel from Transdiffusion 

Organizations established in 1946
Organizations disestablished in 1993
Foreign relations of the Soviet Union
Eastern Bloc
International organizations based in the Czech Republic
Radio organizations
Television organizations
Intervision
Television in the Soviet Union
Communist front organizations
Pan-European trade and professional organizations
Organizations based in Prague